Bilel Ouechtati (born February 15, 1991, in Béja) is an amateur Tunisian freestyle wrestler, who competes in the men's middleweight category. Ouechtati represented Tunisia at the 2012 Summer Olympics in London, where he competed in the men's 74 kg class. He received a bye for the preliminary round of sixteen match, before losing to Kazakhstan's Abdulkhakim Shapiyev, with a two-set technical score (3–5, 0–1), and a classification point score of 1–3.

References

External links
Profile – International Wrestling Database
NBC Olympics Profile

1991 births
Living people
People from Béja Governorate
Tunisian male sport wrestlers
Olympic wrestlers of Tunisia
Wrestlers at the 2012 Summer Olympics
21st-century Tunisian people